Jean-Claude Vannier  (born 1943) is a French musician, composer and arranger. Vannier has composed music, written lyrics, and produced albums for many singers.

Vannier is regarded as an important musician in his native country; music critic Andy Votel noted his Eastern music influences and named him a pop-culture icon of 1970s France, alongside Serge Gainsbourg and Jane Birkin.

Early life
Vannier was born during a bomb scare in Courbevoie, Hauts-de-Seine.  Self-taught, he began playing the piano at age 18, later arranging for Michel Magne and Alice Dona, his first notions of orchestration taken from the books of the "Que sais-je ?" collection.

Career
Jean-Claude collaborated on several film soundtracks including: Les Guichets du Louvre by Michel Mitrani, La Horse by Pierre Granier Deferre, Paris Nous Appartient by Robert Benayoun, Slogan by Pierre Grimblat, Projection Privée by François Leterrier, L'amour Propre by Martin Veyron, La Nuit Tous Les Chats Sont Gris by Gérard Zingg, and Comédie d'été by Daniel Vigne.

Besides his own concerts and diverse musical entertainments, Jean-Claude staged numerous shows for artists such as Véronique Sanson's show with the Prague Symphonic Orchestra at Paris’ Châtelet Theatre, Jane Birkin at the Olympia, “Children's Opera" (for which he also composed the music) and for the Festival of Avignon.

Jean-Claude Vannier has written and recorded six solo albums.  Each release has been played live, at venues such as the Campagne Première Theatre, the Ranelagh Theatre, the Théâtre de la Ville, the Dejazet Theatre, the Trottoirs de Buenos Aires, the Auditorium des Halles, and the Théâtre des Abbesses.

“L’enfant assassin des mouches” is a concept album by Vannier that was released by Night & Day in 2003.  This instrumental album, which inspired Serge Gainsbourg to write the well known cruel tale, was originally recorded  in 1973.  Finders Keepers, a UK record label, released it in 2005 with outstanding quotes from Jarvis Cocker, Jim O’Rourke, David Holmes, Tim Gane, Andy Votel International release in 2006 by Finders Keepers. “Because Music” decided to republish the album in October 2008.  The album has since attained a more notable cult classic status.

Jean-Claude Vannier performed an enormous live show "L'enfant Assassin des Mouches & Melody Nelson" at London's Barbican on 21 October 2006 with guest vocalists Jarvis Cocker, Badly Drawn Boy, Brigitte Fontaine, The Bad Seeds’ Mick Harvey and lead singer from Super Furry Animals, Gruff Rhys.

Publicity for the Barbican concert revealed that the musicians used for the album were Dougie Wright, Big Jim Sullivan, Herbie Flowers and Vic Flick who all joined Vannier for the concert. BBC Concert Orchestra, Crouch End Festival Chorus, a children's string quintet were part of the show

On 22 and 23 October 2008 this show - conceived, arranged and orchestrated by Jean-Claude Vannier - was performed at the Cité de la Musique with guest vocalists :Mathieu Amalric, B at the Cité de la Musique with guest vocalists Alain Chamfort, Mathieu Amalric, Brigitte Fontaine, Brian Molko (Placebo), Martina Topley Bird, Daniel Darc, Clotilde Hesme, Seaming To.

The Lamoureux Orchestra, the Yound Choir of Paris, and the children's string quintet were part of the show. The rhythm section was : bass : Herbie Flowers -  guitars: Claude Engel and Thomas Coeuriot - drums: Pierre Alain Dahan - keyboards : Gérard Bikialo, and a sound effects man : Michel Musseau.

Jean Claude has also  performed in other artistic fields such as:
water colour paintings exhibited (Windsor and Newton Award 1984) at the Autumn Salon, 
journalism (writer for Nouvelles Littéraires, Glamour and the Journal Littéraire), 
the radio (comic gardening and cooking shows for France Culture) and 
directed a video for Maruschka Detmers.

In 1990 he also published his first collection of short stories "Le club des inconsolables” (The Club of the Inconsolable)" (Published by Fixot)

In May 2019 he announced a new project with heavy metal vocalist Mike Patton, entitled Corpse Flower, with an album due in September that year.

Discography

Solo albums
 1972 : L'Enfant assassin des mouches (Insolitudes)
 1974 : L'orchestre de Jean-Claude Vannier interprète les musiques de Georges Brassens
 1975 : Jean-Claude Vannier
 1976 : Des coups de poing dans la gueule
 1980 : Pauvre muezzin
 1981 : Jean-Claude Vannier
 1985 : Public chéri je t'aime
 1990 : Pleurez pas les filles
 2005 : En public & Fait à la maison (2 CD)

Arrangements

Filmography

Feature films 
 1969 : Qu'est-ce qui fait courir les crocodiles ? by Jacques Poitrenaud
 1969 : Paris n'existe pas by Robert Benayoun
 1973 : Projection privée by François Leterrier
 1974 : Les Guichets du Louvre by Michel Mitrani
 1977 : La Nuit, tous les chats sont gris by Gérard Zingg
 1985 : L'amour propre ne le reste jamais longtemps by Martin Veyron, compositeur et acteur (le pianiste)
 1988 : Ada dans la jungle by Gérard Zingg
 1989 : Comédie d'été by Daniel Vigne
 1989 : Bienvenue à bord by Jean-Louis Leconte
 1993 : Je m'appelle Victor by Guy Jacques
 1995 : La Poudre aux yeux by Maurice Dugowson
 2001 : La Tour Montparnasse infernale by Charles Nemes
 2002 : Sauvage innocence by Philippe Garrel
 2003 : Les Amants réguliers by Philippe Garrel
 2004 : Aux Abois by Philippe Collin
 2008 : Leur morale... et la nôtre by Florence Quentin
 2015 : Microbe & Gasoline by Michel Gondry

Television 
 1994 : Personne ne m'aime, by René Dubois
 1994 : Que le jour aille au diable, by Paul Vermus
 1995 : La Belle by Fontenay, by Paule Zajderman
 1998 : La Clé des champs, (6 episodes) by Charles Nemes
 1998 : Les coquelicots sont, by Richard Bohringer
 1999 : Dessine-moi un jouet, Hervé Baslé
 2000 : Sa mère la pute, by Brigitte Roüan
 2001 : Le Baptême du boiteux, by Philippe Venault
 2002 : Le Champ Dolent, le roman by la Terre, d’Hervé Baslé

References

External links
 Jean-Claude Vannier website
 

1943 births
Living people
People from Courbevoie
Eurovision Song Contest conductors
French rock musicians
French composers
French male composers
French music arrangers